The 3rd constituency of the Vendée (French: Troisième circonscription de la Vendée) is a French legislative constituency in the Vendée département. Like the other 576 French constituencies, it elects one MP using the two-round system, with a run-off if no candidate receives over 50% of the vote in the first round.

Description

The 3rd Constituency of the Vendée runs along the Atlantic coast of the department, including the coastal town of Saint-Jean-de-Monts and the island of Noirmoutier-en-l'Île.

The seat supported conservative candidates throughout its history until 2017 when it elected an En Marche deputy.

Assembly Members

Election results

2022

 
 
 
 
 
 
 
|-
| colspan="8" bgcolor="#E9E9E9"|
|-

2017

 
 
 
 
 
 
 
 
|-
| colspan="8" bgcolor="#E9E9E9"|
|-

2012

 
 
 
 
 
 
 
 
|-
| colspan="8" bgcolor="#E9E9E9"|
|-

2007

 
 
 
 
 
 
 
|-
| colspan="8" bgcolor="#E9E9E9"|
|-

2002

 
 
 
 
 
|-
| colspan="8" bgcolor="#E9E9E9"|
|-

1997

References

3